Sistema Nacional de Televisión may refer to:

Sistema Nacional de Televisión (Paraguay)
Sistema Nacional de Televisión (Nicaragua)